is a type of Japanese pottery most famously known for its large size. Ōtani is made in the part of Naruto, Tokushima known as Ōtani.

History 
In 2003, Ōtani pottery was designated as a national traditional handicraft.

Characteristics 
The potter's wheel used in the production of Ōtani pottery is known as a 'nerokuro,' literally a 'lying potter's wheel.' One person must lie on his or her side and turn the wheel with his or her feet. The potter and the assistant must have perfect timing in order to create a successful product. Ōtani pottery is the only pottery in Japan that still uses this technique.

The large containers were used to hold indigo dye, a specialty of the region.
There are also many small bowls, tea ceremony tools, vases, cups, plates, and other forms of pottery made at Ōtani.

External links 
 http://www.tsci.or.jp/ooasa/ootaniyaki.html

Japanese pottery
Culture in Tokushima Prefecture